Deep Run is a tributary of the Canandaigua Lake in Ontario County, New York in the United States.

References

Rivers of New York (state)
Rivers of Ontario County, New York